William Donald Bailey  (born March 24, 1961) is a former American football center. He played in the National Football League (NFL) for the Indianapolis Colts from 1984-1985.

He played college football for the Miami Hurricanes.

References 

1961 births
Living people
American football centers
Miami Hurricanes football players
Tampa Bay Buccaneers players
Indianapolis Colts players